The iPhone 12 and iPhone 12 Mini (stylized and marketed as iPhone 12 mini) are a range of smartphones designed, developed, and marketed by Apple Inc. They are the fourteenth-generation, "affordable flagship" iPhones, succeeding the iPhone 11. They were unveiled at a virtually held Apple Special Event at Apple Park in Cupertino, California on October 13, 2020, alongside the "premium flagship" iPhone 12 Pro and iPhone 12 Pro Max and HomePod Mini. Pre-orders for the iPhone 12 started on October 16, 2020, and the phone became available in most countries on October 23, 2020 alongside the iPhone 12 Pro and fourth-generation iPad Air. Pre-orders for the iPhone 12 Mini began on November 6, 2020, and the phone was made available on November 13, 2020, alongside the iPhone 12 Pro Max.

The major upgrades over the iPhone 11 include the addition of a Super Retina XDR OLED as opposed to the Liquid Retina LED-backlit LCD IPS panel on the iPhone 11 and XR, 5G support, the introduction of MagSafe, Apple A14 Bionic system on a chip (SoC) and high-dynamic-range video Dolby Vision 4K up to 30 fps. The iPhone 12 and iPhone 12 Mini, like the iPhone 12 Pro and iPhone 12 Pro Max, are the first iPhone models from Apple to no longer include a power adapter or EarPods headphones found in prior iPhone models; however, a USB-C to Lightning cable is included; this change was retroactively applied to other iPhone models sold by Apple, such as the iPhone XR, iPhone 11 and the second-generation iPhone SE.

The iPhone 12 Mini was discontinued and removed from Apple's website after the announcement of the iPhone 14 and iPhone 14 Pro on September 7, 2022.

Design 

The iPhone 12 and 12 Mini is the first major redesign since the iPhone X. It features a chassis with flat edges, similar to the iPhone 4 and iPhone 5 designs, as well as the iPad Pro since 2018, and the 4th-generation iPad Air, which was also released in 2020. The notch size is similar to previous iPhone models, despite speculation about a reduction in width. The borders around the display are thinner by 35% than any previous model. The new design also comes with a ceramic-hardened front glass, marketed as Ceramic Shield, while the back retains the previous generation Dual-Ion Exchange strengthened glass.

On April 20, 2021 at Apple's Special Event “Spring Loaded”, Apple revealed a new purple color option which became available on April 30, 2021.

The iPhone 12 and 12 Mini are available in six colors: Black, White, Product Red, Green, Blue, and Purple.

Specifications

Hardware 
The iPhone 12 and iPhone 12 Mini use Apple's six-core A14 Bionic processor, which contains a next-generation neural engine. They both have three internal storage options: 64, 128, and 256 GB. Both also carry an IP68 water and dust resistance rating along with dirt and grime, and is water-resistant up to six meters (20 feet) for 30 minutes. However, the manufacturer warranty does not cover liquid damage to the phone.

The iPhone 12 series are the first iPhone models to be supplied from launch without EarPods or a wall adapter, which Apple says was done to reduce carbon emissions and waste since most users already own them. Apple also claims 70% more boxes can fit on a pallet given the smaller box, and thus further reducing emissions. A USB-C to Lightning cord is still included. This change also applies retroactively to all other iPhone models still in production.  To comply with French law regarding wireless device radiation and health which requires phones to be bundled with and promote use of hands-free accessories by children under 14, iPhone models will still include EarPods in this market.

A magnetic connector known as MagSafe is introduced on the iPhone 12 models, allowing accessories such as cases and charging cords to be attached to the rear of the device. Accessories can also be stacked together.

The devices support 5G cellular communications. This allows upload speeds of up to 200 Mbit/s and download speeds of up to 4 Gbit/s. However, only models sold in the U.S. support the fastest mmWave technology; those sold elsewhere in the world, including Canada, support only sub-6 GHz frequency bands. A new feature called Smart Data Mode enables 5G only when necessary to preserve battery life.

Displays 
The iPhone 12 features a  display with Super Retina XDR OLED technology at a resolution of 2532 × 1170 pixels and a pixel density of about 460 ppi. The iPhone 12 Mini features a  display with the same technology at a resolution of 2340 × 1080 pixels, and a pixel density of about 476 ppi. Both phones have a peak brightness of 1200 nits when viewing HDR content equivalent to the iPhone 12 Pro, and normal brightness of 625 nits. Both phones also use an improved glass-ceramic covering called Ceramic Shield which is co-developed with Corning Inc. Apple describes it as having "4 times better drop performance" and being "tougher than any smartphone glass".

Batteries 
The iPhone 12 has a 10.78 Wh (2,815 mAh) battery, a slight decrease from the 11.91 Wh (3,110 mAh) battery found in the iPhone 11 and identical to the battery found in the iPhone 12 Pro. The iPhone 12 Mini has a 8.57 Wh (2,227 mAh) battery. Like previous iPhones, the battery is not user-replaceable.

Chipsets 
Both the iPhone 12 and 12 Mini have the Apple A14 Bionic, the first ARM-based smartphone system-on-a-chip (SoC) manufactured on the 5 nm process node. However, unlike previous years, they are not the first Apple devices to receive the newest A-series processor, with the fourth-generation iPad Air being the first. Both phones use Qualcomm's X55 5G modem.

Cameras 
Both phones have two rear 12-megapixel cameras: wide and ultra-wide. The wide camera is a 26 mm full-frame equivalent with an f/1.6 aperture which captures 27% more light than the f/1.8 aperture in the iPhone 11 and a seven-element lens. The ultra-wide camera is a 13 mm full-frame equivalent with an f/2.4 aperture and a five-element lens.

All cameras now support Night Mode for both photo and  time-lapse video at full resolution. Smart HDR has been improved thanks to Smart HDR 3. This iPhone model is the first capable of shooting 10-bit high dynamic range Dolby Vision 4K video at up to 30 fps which allows for greater brightness and deeper shadows.

The front-facing, TrueDepth camera features a 12-megapixel camera with an f/2.2 aperture. This model also added Night Mode to the front-facing camera.

Sensors

The iPhone 12 and 12 Mini include mostly the same sensors found on prior iPhone models going back to the iPhone X. These include an accelerometer, gyroscope, barometer, proximity sensor, ambient light sensor, and a digital compass. The devices also include the Face ID sensor for biometric authentication.

Software 

Both phones originally shipped with iOS 14. The devices come with the stock iOS apps, such as Safari, Weather, and Messages, and they include Siri, the personal assistant in iOS. They received iOS 15 on September 20, 2021, and they also support iOS 16 which was released on September 12, 2022.

Reception 

The iPhone 12 received largely positive reviews. The Verge called it a "beautiful, powerful, and incredibly capable device", praising the new design reminiscent of the iPhone 5, the speed of the A14 Bionic processor, its 5G capabilities, addition of the OLED display like on the high end iPhones, combined with much slimmer bezels than previous iPhone models and improved battery life over iPhone 11. Engadget also gave the iPhone 12 a positive review, praising the MagSafe wireless charging and accessories magnetic attachment as well as the redesigned camera system, a greatly improved display like in its Pro counterparts.

iPhone 12 is the third best-selling and the most popular model globally in Q2 2021.

Apple was criticized for the continued reliance on Face ID as the sole biometric option to unlock the device, which is incompatible with face masks. iOS 14.5 allowed the use of a paired Apple Watch to unlock the phone while wearing a mask, while iOS 15.4 allows unlocking with a mask on, without an Apple Watch. The third-generation iPhone SE is the only iPhone currently produced by Apple that supports Touch ID, an alternative unlocking option that is compatible with face masks. All models can still use a passcode to log in.

The iPhone 12 mini has received more mixed reviews. Some praised the phone for being a new small phone, while others criticized the price and inferior battery life compared to the full-size 12 (although the battery life of the iPhone 12 mini is longer than that of the second-generation iPhone SE).

"OLED-gate"

Within two weeks after its public release, a thread was started at Apple Support Communities describing a problem with the iPhone 12 and iPhone 12 Pro OLED panel black pixels not shutting off completely in black scenes, resulting in what was described as "ugly glowing". A considerable number of users have since posted replies reporting the same problem, photos and videos have been shared online demonstrating the issue. As of January 2021, Apple has not yet made an official statement.

EarPods and power adapter controversy 
Apple, claiming an environmental initiative, has removed the EarPods and power adapter from all new iPhone boxes, including the iPhone 12, 12 Mini, and iPhone 12 Pro. It is claimed that removing these items would reduce e-waste and permit a smaller iPhone box, allowing more devices to be transported simultaneously to decrease carbon footprint. Apple now includes a USB-C to Lightning cable, incompatible with the existing USB-A power adapters that Apple previously supplied with its devices. Users can still use their existing USB-A power adapters and cables, but must purchase a USB-C power adapter sold separately to enable fast charging.

In December 2020, a Brazilian consumer rights watchdog Procon-SP Foundation requested Apple to provide proof that not including chargers is beneficial to the environment. The watchdog argues that Apple removing the charger is harming consumers and wants to force the company to include one as it claims the charger is an essential component.

The Verge released an article the week before the launch of the phone suggesting the real reason that chargers and EarPods are no longer included could be to offset the increased cost of 5G components. These new components are reported to cost 30% more than their predecessors.

Repairability concerns 
iFixit and Australian YouTuber Hugh Jeffreys discovered that a number of key components such as the cameras would malfunction or display warnings if they are replaced with new ones or those taken from an otherwise identical donor unit. Internal Apple documents also mention that, beginning with the iPhone 12 and in subsequent models, authorized technicians would have to run the phones through an internal System Configuration tool to reprogram repaired units in order to account for hardware changes. While Apple has yet to comment on the issue, the inability to replace key system components have raised concerns about right to repair and planned obsolescence. However, the iPhone 12 Mini does not have this issue. Apple later addressed the issue with the release of iOS 14.4, which displays a warning message if the phone detects an unpaired camera module but otherwise allows for full functionality.

See also 
 Comparison of smartphones
 History of the iPhone
 List of iOS devices
 Timeline of iPhone models

Explanatory notes

References

External links 
  – official site

IOS
Flagship smartphones
Mobile phones introduced in 2020
Mobile phones with 4K video recording
Mobile phones with multiple rear cameras